Katha (sometimes also spelled Kathar,) (Shan: ၵၢတ်ႇသႃႇ) is a town in Sagaing Region, Myanmar, on the west side of the Irrawaddy River on a bluff with an average elevation of . Katha is known for having inspired Kyauktada, the fictional setting of George Orwell's Burmese Days.

Location

A small branch of railway runs east from Naba to Katha. Katha can also be reached by ferries that run on the Irrawaddy River between the upstream town of Bhamo down to Mandalay. There is also direct bus service from Mandalay to Katha, but it is a bumpy ride.

Climate

Katha has a tropical savanna climate (Köppen climate classification Aw) bordering on a humid subtropical climate (Köppen Cwa). Temperatures are very warm to hot throughout the year, with milder winter months (December–February). There is a winter dry season (November–March) and a summer wet season (April–October).

Economy
Katha is the administrative seat of Katha District which comprises seven small townships. Katha is populated with government offices and many of the early town settlers were from every part of Burma and usually had background history of civil service under at least one of ministerial departments. The main economy of the town is fisheries and farming of kidney beans. Production of rice in the Katha Township is less than its consumption and Katha has to depend on imports from the nearby townships such as Indaw or Kawlin. Katha is a legendarily bureaucratic stronghold, and its prosperity is crippled by it.

Setting of George Orwell's Burmese Days

Katha is known in literature as the real place underlying the fictional Kyauktada, setting of George Orwell's first novel Burmese Days (1934). Orwell himself served at Katha in 1926-27 in the Indian Imperial Police. The British Club (including active tennis court), police station, and town jail are locations mentioned in the novel that can still be visited today. More accounts on this section is readable in Emma Larkin's "Finding George Orwell in Burma". Katha links with prominent Burmese writers such as  Shwe U Daung, Thaw Tar Swe, Theik-Pan Muu Tin, and AFPFL leader Kyaw Nyein from Stable faction.

In September 2019, the Katha Heritage Trust opened a museum at the house that Orwell lived in during his time in Katha.  The two-story wooden building had been an attraction for Western tourists.  The museum features portraits and a picture of Orwell, and a painting of the house.  One stated aim of the trust was to cooperate with the Orwell Trust in the United Kingdom to restore momentos of Orwell's time in Katha.

Notes

External links
 "Katha, Burma", Falling Rain Genomics, Inc.
 "Katha Map — Satellite Images of Katha", Maplandia

See also

 George Orwell

Township capitals of Myanmar
Populated places in Sagaing Region
Irrawaddy River